Ma Weimao is a Chinese diplomat. He was Ambassador of the People's Republic of China to Albania from 1996 to 1999.

References

Ambassadors of China to Albania
Living people
Year of birth missing (living people)
Place of birth missing (living people)
20th-century Chinese people